Lowemont is an unincorporated community in Leavenworth County, Kansas, United States.  It is part of the Kansas City metropolitan area.

History
A post office was opened in Lowemont in 1888, and remained in operation until it was discontinued in 1938.

References

Further reading

External links
 Leavenworth County maps: Current, Historic, KDOT

Unincorporated communities in Leavenworth County, Kansas
Unincorporated communities in Kansas